Spillville is a city in Winneshiek County, Iowa, United States. The population was 385 at the time of the 2020 census. Spillville is known for its Independence Day fireworks display, held the first Saturday in July.

History
Spillville was platted by German Joseph Spielmann in 1860. Originally named Spielville after the founder, Joseph Spielman, the community's name was misread and became Spillville.

It was largely settled by Bohemian, German and Swiss immigrants.

Spillville boasts a strong cultural and musical history. The Czech composer Antonín Dvořák spent the summer of 1893 in Spillville, where his friend Josef Jan Kovařík had relatives. There he completed the monumental Symphony No. 9 in E minor, "From the New World", as well as two of his most famous chamber works, the String Quartet in F ("The American") and the String Quintet in E-flat. Spillville is also the site of the Inwood Ballroom, established in 1920 and the destination of several popular 20th-century musicians such as Louis Armstrong, Glenn Miller, Guy Lombardo, and The Byrds. Many tourists to Spillville have also visited the Bily Clocks Museum (see link below), a collection of intricately designed clocks created by two brothers in Spillville housed in the building where Dvořák lived during his stay.

The Roman Catholic parish in Spillville, St. Wenceslaus Church, was built in 1860 and is the oldest Czech Catholic church in the United States.

Geography
Spillville is located at  (43.202, -91.952).

Demographics

2010 census
As of the census of 2010, there were 367 people, 168 households, and 96 families living in the city. The racial makeup of the city was 96.5% White, 0.3% African American, 0.3% Native American, and 3.0% from other races. Hispanic or Latino of any race were 3.3% of the population.

There were 168 households, of which 26.8% had children under the age of 18 living with them, 50.6% were married couples living together, 4.2% had a female householder with no husband present, 2.4% had a male householder with no wife present, and 42.9% were non-families. 35.7% of all households were made up of individuals, and 21.4% had someone living alone who was 65 years of age or older. The average household size was 2.18 and the average family size was 2.90.

The median age in the city was 42.8 years. 22.3% of residents were under the age of 18; 5.9% were between the ages of 18 and 24; 23.2% were from 25 to 44; 23.3% were from 45 to 64; and 25.1% were 65 years of age or older. The gender makeup of the city was 50.7% male and 49.3% female.

2000 census
As of the census of 2000, there were 386 people, 172 households, and 110 families living in the city. The racial makeup of the city was 98.70% White, 0.78% Native American, 0.26% Asian, 0.26% from other races. Hispanic or Latino of any race were 1.55% of the population.

There were 172 households, out of which 29.7% had children under the age of 18 living with them, 55.2% were married couples living together, 7.6% had a female householder with no husband present, and 35.5% were non-families. 32.0% of all households were made up of individuals, and 20.3% had someone living alone who was 65 years of age or older. The average household size was 2.24 and the average family size was 2.85.

24.6% are under the age of 18, 5.7% from 18 to 24, 28.5% from 25 to 44, 18.4% from 45 to 64, and 22.8% who were 65 years of age or older. The median age was 38 years. For every 100 females, there were 96.9 males. For every 100 females age 18 and over, there were 94.0 males.

The median income for a household in the city was $32,500, and the median income for a family was $41,563. Males had a median income of $30,909 versus $20,938 for females. The per capita income for the city was $15,674. About 5.0% of families and 6.9% of the population were below the poverty line, including 4.3% of those under age 18 and 20.5% of those age 65 or over.

Parks
 Riverside Park & the Inwood Pavilion

Education
The community is within the South Winneshiek Community School District.

CFS Catholic School formed as a consolidation of Catholic schools in Calmar, Festina, and Spillville. Prior to fall 2020 its campuses are St. Aloysius Center in Calmar and St. Wenceslaus Center in Spillville. In 2019 CFS and St. Theresa of Calcutta in Ossian announced plans to consolidate into a single school, with the Calmar campus closing. Beginning fall 2020 the Ossian campus will house grades K-2 and middle school while the Spillville campus will house grades 3–4.

References

External links
 Spillville website
 Bily Clocks Museum website

Cities in Winneshiek County, Iowa
Cities in Iowa
Czech-American culture in Iowa
Populated places established in 1849
1849 establishments in Iowa